"Superhero" is a song by American rock band Falling in Reverse. It was released on July 10, 2017. The music video for the song had over 5 million views on YouTube. The song had over 10 million plays on Spotify. It was released as the fourth single from Falling in Reverse's fourth studio album, Coming Home.

Background
The single was written by Ronnie Radke, Christian Thompson and Stevie Aiello. The song is about a boy who cannot save the world if he cannot even save himself. The music video for the song is inspired by the Netflix series, "Stranger Things", and shows three children who suffer abuse and harassment by friends and family, come together to escape from this planet.

Personnel
 Ronnie Radke — lead vocals, production
 Derek Jones — rhythm guitar, backing vocals
 Ryan Seaman — drums, percussion, backing vocals
 Zakk Sandler — bass, backing vocals
 Christian Thompson — lead guitar, backing vocals

Charts

References

2017 singles
2017 songs
Falling in Reverse songs
Songs written by Ronnie Radke
Songs written by Stevie Aiello
Epitaph Records singles